The 2002 National Football League, known for sponsorship reasons as the Allianz National Football League, was the 71st staging of the National Football League (NFL), an annual Gaelic football tournament for the Gaelic Athletic Association county teams of Ireland.
This was the first NFL season to take place in a single calendar year. Tyrone beat Cavan in the Division 1 final, while Kerry took Division Two.

Format

League structure
The top 16 teams were drawn into Divisions 1A and 1B. The other 16 teams were drawn into Divisions 2A and 2B. Each team played all the other teams in its section once: either home or away. Teams earned 2 points for a win and 1 for a draw.

Finals, promotions and relegations
The top two teams in Divisions 1A and 1B progressed to the Division 1 semi-finals while the bottom two teams in Divisions 1A and 1B were relegated. The top two teams in Divisions 2A and 2B progressed to the Division 2 semi-finals and were promoted to Division 1A and 1B, respectively.

Tie-breaker
If two or more teams are level on points, points difference was used to rank the teams.

Division 1

Division 1A Table

Division 1A Rounds 1 to 7

Division 1B Table

Division 1B Rounds 1 to 7

Division 1 Semi-finals

Division 1 Final

Division 2

Division 2A Table

Division 2A Rounds 1 to 7

Division 2B Table

Division 2B Rounds 1 to 7

Division 2 Semi-finals

Division 2 Final

Statistics
All scores correct as of 6 March 2016

Scoring
Widest winning margin: 24
Louth  2-19 - 0-1 London  (Division 2a)
London  0-5 - 4-17 Armagh  (Division 2a)
Most goals in a match: 6
Roscommon  3-11 - 3-11 Galway  (Division 1a)
Most points in a match: 34
Tyrone  3-20 - 0-14 Roscommon  (Division 1a)
Most goals by one team in a match: 4
Waterford  1-12 - 4-13 Longford  (Division 2b)
London  0-5 - 4-17 Armagh  (Division 2a)
London  0-4 - 4-13 Kerry  (Division 2a)
Kildare  0-7 - 4-5 Mayo  (Division 1b)
 Highest aggregate score: 43 points
Tyrone  3-20 - 0-14 Roscommon  (Division 1a)
Wexford  2-19 - 2-12 Laois  (Division 2b)
Lowest aggregate score: 15 points
Mayo  0-10 - 0-5 Down  (Division 1b)

References

National Football League
National Football League (Ireland) seasons